is a Japanese given name, which can also be used as a surname.

Possible writings
Itsuki can be written using different kanji characters and can mean:
樹, "tree"
斎, "servant of God (Shinto)"
維月, "fiber moon"
伊月, "that one moon"
as a surname
五木, "five trees"
The given name can also be written in hiragana or katakana.

People

Given name 
, ring name by Aika Aoki, Japanese wrestler
, Japanese baseball player
, Japanese footballer
, Japanese mixed martial artist
Itsuki Kurata (倉田 一輝, born 1999), Japanese footballer
Itsuki Sagara (相楽 樹, born 1995), Japanese actress 
Itsuki Shoda (正田 樹, born 1981), Japanese professional baseball player
Itsuki Someno (染野 唯月, born 2001), Japanese professional footballer
Itsuki Toyama (外山 斎, born 1976), Japanese politician
Itsuki Oda (小田 逸稀, born 1998), Japanese football 
, Japanese footballer
, Japanese footballer
Itsuki Yamada (山田 樹), Japanese footballer
Itsuki Yamazaki (山崎 五紀), a Japanese female professional wrestler

Surname 
Hironori Itsuki (born 1940), Japanese rower
Hiroshi Itsuki (五木 ひろし, born 1948), Japanese enka singer
Hiroyuki Itsuki (五木 寛之, born 1932), Japanese novelist
Natsumi Itsuki (樹 なつみ, born 1960), Japanese shōjo manga artist
Yui Itsuki (伊月  ゆい), Japanese voice actress

Characters

Given name 
Itsuki Akiba (秋葉 いつき), a character in romance manga I"s
Itsuki Fujii (樹), a character in the 1995 Japanese film Love Letter
Itsuki Koizumi (一樹), a character in the Haruhi Suzumiya series
Itsuki Kusunoki, a character in Natsunagu!
Itsuki Midoriba (樹), a character in the visual novel Shuffle!
Itsuki Iba (いつき), a character in the light novel series Rental Magica
Itsuki Minami (樹), the primary protagonist of the manga and anime Air Gear
Itsuki Myoudouin, a character in the anime series HeartCatch PreCure!
Itsuki Inubouzaki, a character in Yuuki Yuuna wa Yuusha de Aru
Itsuki Onra, a character in Inazuma Eleven
Itsuki Nakano, a character in The Quintessential Quintuplets
Itsuki Maeda, a character in the novel Itsuki
Itsuki Marude, a character in the manga Tokyo Ghoul
Itsuki Katagiri, a character in the anime and game Dream Festival!

Surname 
Mamoru Itsuki (一樹), a main character in the survival horror video game Forbidden Siren 2
Marehiko Itsuki, a character in the manga series The Prince of Tennis
Ranru Itsuki, a character in Bakuryuu Sentai Abaranger.
Shu Itsuki, a member of the unit ‘Valkyrie’ from Japanese rhythm game Ensemble stars

See also
Itsuki Lullaby, a folk song representative of Kyūshū, Japan
Itsuki, Kumamoto, Japan

Japanese-language surnames
Japanese unisex given names